La pietra di Marco Polo is an Italian children's adventure television series set in Venice. It was produced by RAI.

See also
List of Italian television series

External links
 

Italian television series
Italian children's action television series
Italian children's adventure television series
1980s Italian television series
1982 television series debuts
1983 television series endings
Television shows set in Venice